Open Slather is an Australian sketch comedy television series which first aired on The Comedy Channel on Foxtel on 24 May 2015. The 20 episode series is executively produced by Laura Waters and Rick McKenna. After the first ten episodes aired, the series experienced a hiatus while new episodes were in production. Replacing new episodes were 30 minute 'best of' episodes titled Open Slather Reopened. The second block of ten episodes began airing on 6 September, and concluded on 8 November 2015.

On 31 December 2015, it was announced the show had been cancelled.

Cast 

 Holly Austin
 Hannah Bath
 Shane Jacobson
 Jay K. Cagatay
 Dave Eastgate
 Gina Riley
 Stephen Curry
 Ben Gerrard
 Laura Hughes
 Demi Lardner
 Magda Szubanski
 Ben Lomas
 Marg Downey
 Miles O'Neil
 Glenn Robbins
 Ilai Swindells
 Jane Turner (11 episodes)
 Emily Taheny
 Michael Veitch
 George H. Xanthis

Guest 
 Franklyn Ajaye (1 episode)

Special guests 

 Mark Holden as himself (1 episode)
 Hamish Blake as God (3 episodes)
 Dave Lawson (9 episodes)
 Gerry Connolly (1 episode)
 Sting as himself (1 episode)
 Paul Hogan as Cardinal (1 episode)
 Peter Rowsthorn (5 episodes)
 Amy Schumer (1 episode)
 Bill Hader (1 episode)
 John Flaus (3 episodes)
 Jane Hall (1 episode)
 Colin Lane (1 episode)
 Eddie Perfect (3 episodes)
 John Wood (2 episodes)
 Ronda Rousey (1 episode)
 Nick Bracks (1 episode)
 Geoff Morrell (3 episodes)
 Christie Whelan Browne (1 episode)

Parodied characters 
 Hannah Bath — Mary, Crown Princess of Denmark, Kirstie Allsop 
 Jay K. Cagatay — Tony Abbott, Ed Sheeran, Jon Snow, Johnny Depp, Redfoo, Calum Hood, Harry Styles, Jesus, Russell Brand, Julian Assange, Hamburglar, Steve Baxter, Pete Evans, Jonathan Ive
 Marg Downey — Helen Clark
 Ben Gerrard — Donatella Versace
 Gina Riley — Liz Hayes, Gina Rileyano, Anna Wintour, Hillary Clinton
 Magda Szubanski — Angela Merkel, Gina Rinehart
 Jane Turner - Julie Bishop, Grant Denyer
 George H. Xanthis — Don Draper

Writers 

 Holly Austin (episodes 5, 9, 11, 15, 20)
 Hannah Bath (episodes 3, 8, 10, 17, 19, 20)
 Jay K. Cagatay (episodes 2, 5, 7, 9, 11)
 Paul Calleja
 John Campbell (episodes 1, 3–14, 17–20)
 Bryan Cockerill (episode 18)
 Mark Conway (episode 3)
 Lucas Crandles (episodes 13–17, 19)
 Stephen Curry (episodes 1–8, 10–18)
 Des Dowling (episode 7)
 Marg Downey (episodes 7, 10–13, 15, 16, 19, 20)
 Dave Eastgate (episodes 17, 18)
 Ben Gerrard (episodes 4, 8, 17, 18, 20)
 Happy Hammond (episodes 1–8)
 Jess Harris (episodes 10–13, 15, 17, 18, 20)
 Tegan Higginbotham (episodes 2–11, 17–20)
 Angus Hodge (episode 13)
 Laura Hughes (episode 3, 8, 9, 11, 15, 19, 20)
 Rhett Hughes (episodes 3–8, 11–14, 16–20)
 Shane Jacobson (episodes 1–3, 6–8, 10–12, 16)
 Dan Knight (episode 8)
 Demi Lardner (episodes 4, 5, 11, 13, 18)
 Dave Lawson (episodes 3, 4, 10, 11, 13–18)
 Ben Lomas (episodes 4–6, 8, 9, 14, 15)
 Brendan Luno (episodes 1–14, 17)
 Doug MacLeod (episodes 2–7)
 Shannon Marinko (episode 6, 9, 10)
 Cameron Marshall (episodes 2, 6, 9, 12, 14–20)
 Ray Matsen (episode 8)
 Zoe McDonald (episodes 8, 9, 11, 14, 18)
 Maggie McKenna (episodes 1, 2, 4, 11)
 Lauren Merolli (episodes 11–13, 16)
 Steve Mitchell (episodes 5, 13)
 Tony Moclair (episodes 1–7, 11, 13, 15, 18)
 Nick Musgrove
 Timothy Nash (episodes 13–17, 19)
 Dave O'Neil (episodes 1–8, 10–17, 19, 20)
 Miles O'Neil (episodes 6–9, 12, 13)
 Mark O'Toole (episodes 1–14, 18)
 Nick Place (episodes 7, 12, 15)
 Anita Punton (episodes 1–18)
 Amanda Reedy (episodes 4, 8, 14, 18–20)
 Gina Riley (episodes 1–8, 10–12, 14–18)
 Glenn Robbins (episodes 1, 2, 4–9, 11, 12, 14–17, 19, 20)
 Peter Rowsthorn (episode 10)
 Adam Rozenbachs (episodes 1–15, 17, 18, 20)
 Joel Slack-Smith (episode 14)
 Ilai Swindells (episodes 7, 11, 15, 19)
 Magda Szubanski (episodes 1, 7, 11–13, 20)
 Emily Taheny (episodes 7, 10, 11, 15)
 Richard Thorp (episodes 17, 18)
 Nathan Valvo (episode 19)
 Lory Vecchio (episodes 3, 15, 20)
 Michael Veitch (episodes 4, 5, 15)
 Paul Verhoeven (episodes 2, 6)
 Eric Walsh (episode 8)
 Michael Ward (episodes 3, 6–9, 11–15)
 Tom Ward (episode 18, 19)
 Nick Weller (episodes 4, 5, 7)
 George H. Xanthis (episodes 3, 7, 9, 19, 20)

Head writers 
 Nick Weller 
 Phil Van Bruchem

Episodes

Reception 
Ben Nuetze of Crikey wrote "Open Slather is an apt title for Foxtel's brand new sprawling sketch show...In fact, I don't think I've ever seen a sketch show which is so eclectic and disconnected in terms of style. In moments it wears its politics on its sleeve; in others it sets about satirising Australian society, and it often picks up on the classic parody style of Fast Forward. There's really no singular idea holding all of this together, and the show seems to have no real focus and no clear reason for being...And yet, it's often surprisingly excellent."

David Knox of TV Tonight commented "On the positive side, there were some great laughs to be found in Open Slather....A strong cast of emerging comedians....slipped in with ease alongside Fast Forward veterans in this mix of popular culture, social and political humour. On the less-positive side some of the sketches struggled.....whilst others made me uneasy that they were trying to recapture Fast Forward magic with a tone stuck in the 80s."

Notes

References

External links 
 
 

2015 Australian television series debuts
Australian television sketch shows
English-language television shows
The Comedy Channel original programming
Cultural depictions of Angela Merkel
Cultural depictions of Hillary Clinton